Columbarium corollaceoum is a species of large sea snail, a marine gastropod mollusc in the family Turbinellidae.

References

Turbinellidae
Gastropods described in 2003